The following is the 1951–52 network television schedule for the four major English language commercial broadcast networks in the United States. The schedule covers primetime hours from September 1951 through March 1952. The schedule is followed by a list per network of returning series, new series, and series cancelled after the 1950–51 season. This was the first television season of national network interconnection by coaxial cable and microwave, meaning programming could be transmitted live coast-to-coast (or in the case of filmed programs, distributed simultaneously across the country) if needed.

On Sunday nights, NBC experimented with airing its new comedy-variety program Chesterfield Sound-off Time (featuring Bob Hope, Fred Allen and Jerry Lester as rotating hosts) in an early evening timeslot, 7:00–7:30. Previously, network TV variety programs had only been aired during late evening hours; NBC had experimented with a late-night show, Broadway Open House, with Lester as host the previous season, but that show was not considered a success (it was replaced by the more generic Mary Kay's Nightcap this season). According to television historians Castleman and Podrazik (1982), the experiment was designed to "duplicate the early-evening radio success of Jack Benny". (Benny himself would appear on rival network CBS's The Jack Benny Program immediately following Chesterfield Sound-off Time). Red Skelton also made his network television debut on NBC's Sunday night schedule this season, but long-term success eluded him until after he moved to CBS in the fall of 1953.

Although most TV programming was live, both CBS and NBC also experimented in filmed series; Castleman and Podrazik highlight early filmed hits I Love Lucy on CBS and Dragnet on NBC. Dragnet was "one of NBC's first major experiments in filmed TV series"; the series was added to NBC's regular network schedule in January 1952, after a "preview" on Chesterfield Sound-off Time in December 1951. I Love Lucy was given what historians have called a "choice time slot": Monday night immediately following the number one program on television: Arthur Godfrey's Talent Scouts. The series "proved the strength and acceptability of TV sitcoms, giving [CBS] a strong weapon against NBC's flashy comedy-variety hours".

DuMont, too, avoided flashy comedy series when in February 1952, in desperation the network added Bishop Fulton Sheen's program, Life Is Worth Living, to its Tuesday night schedule. The religious series was pitted against NBC's hit program Texaco Star Theater, and became the surprise hit of the year, holding its own against Texaco host "Uncle Miltie", and attracting a sponsor, an Emmy, and 10 million viewers. The ABC and CBS programs which aired in the same time slot, Charlie Wild, Private Detective, and The Frank Sinatra Show (respectively), attracted relatively few viewers.

New fall series are highlighted in bold.

Each of the 30 highest-rated shows is listed with its rank and rating as determined by Nielsen Media Research.

 Yellow indicates the programs in the top 10 for the season.
 Cyan indicates the programs in the top 20 for the season.
 Magenta indicates the programs in the top 30 for the season.

Sunday 

On CBS, The Jack Benny Show (9/42.8) aired as occasional specials once every six to eight weeks at 7:30-8:00 pm.
On NBC, Hopalong Cassidy (28/32.2) aired 6–7 p.m. until December, when it was partly replaced by The Roy Rogers Show (27/32.7), airing 6:30–7 p.m.

Monday 

Notes: On NBC, Kukla, Fran and Ollie was reduced from 30 to 15 minutes in November 1951, and Bob and Ray was added at 7:15 p.m. Bob and Ray ran in the 7:15 p.m. time slot Monday through Friday until March 1952 and then on Tuesday and Thursday only until May 1952, while Kukla, Fran and Ollie continued in its 15-minute format at 7:00 p.m. until June 1952. In January 1952, The Speidel Show was renamed for its star, Paul Winchell, becoming The Paul Winchell Show.

Tuesday 

Note: On NBC, Kukla, Fran and Ollie was reduced from 30 to 15 minutes in November 1951, and Bob and Ray was added at 7:15 p.m. Bob and Ray ran in the 7:15 p.m. time slot Monday through Friday until March 1952 and then on Tuesday and Thursday only until May 1952, while Kukla, Fran and Ollie continued in its 15-minute format at 7:00 p.m. until June 1952.

Wednesday 

Notes: On NBC, Kukla, Fran and Ollie was reduced from 30 to 15 minutes in November 1951, and Bob and Ray was added at 7:15 p.m. Bob and Ray ran in the 7:15 p.m. time slot Monday through Friday until March 1952 and then on Tuesday and Thursday only until May 1952, while Kukla, Fran and Ollie continued in its 15-minute format at 7:00 p.m. until June 1952.

(*) From December 1951 to June 1952, these shows were 30 minutes, 10pm to 10:30pm ET

Thursday 

Notes: Wayne King was seen only on NBC's Midwest Network. On NBC, Kukla, Fran and Ollie was reduced from 30 to 15 minutes in November 1951, and Bob and Ray was added at 7:15 p.m. Bob and Ray ran in the 7:15 p.m. time slot Monday through Friday until March 1952 and then on Tuesday and Thursday only until May 1952, while Kukla, Fran and Ollie continued in its 15-minute format at 7:00 p.m. until June 1952.

Friday 

Notes: Henry Morgan's Great Talent Hunt replaced Versatile Varieties on January 26, 1951.

On NBC, Kukla, Fran and Ollie was reduced from 30 to 15 minutes in November 1951, and Bob and Ray was added at 7:15 p.m. Bob and Ray ran in the 7:15 p.m. time slot Monday through Friday until March 1952 and then on Tuesday and Thursday only until May 1952, while Kukla, Fran and Ollie continued in its 15-minute format at 7:00 p.m. until June 1952.

Saturday 

Notes: On NBC, All-Star Revue formerly was known as Four Star Revue. Bob and Ray,  broadcast earlier in the season as a 15-minute weeknight program, expanded to 30 minutes and ran from July to August at 7:30 p.m. Eastern Time.

By network

ABC

Returning Series
Admission Free
After the Deadlines
America's Health
The Arthur Murray Party
The Beulah Show
The Bill Gwinn Show
The Carmel Myers Show
Chance of a Lifetime
Charlie Wild, Private Detective (moved from CBS)
The Clock (moved from NBC)
Curtain Up
Don McNeill's TV Club
Hollywood Premiere Theatre
Hollywood Screen Test
Industries for America
The Jerry Colonna Show
Life Begins at Eighty
Life with Linkletter
The Lone Ranger
The Marshall Plan in Action
Masland at the Party
Music in Velvet
On Trial
Other Lands, Other People
The Paul Dixon Show
Paul Whiteman's Goodyear Revue
Q.E.D.
The Ruggles
Say It with Acting
Stop the Music
Studs's Place
The Symphony
United or Not
Versatile Varieties
The Voice of Firestone
What Do You Think?
Wrestling from Rainbo Arena
You Asked For It
Youth on the March

New Series
The Amazing Mr. Malone
Betty Crocker Star Matinee
The Big Picture
Byline *
Celanese Theater
Crime with Father
Curtain Call *
The Dell O'Dell Show
Gruen Guild Playhouse
Harness Racing
Herb Shriner Time
Hour of Decision
Lesson in Safety
Mr. Arsenic *
Mystery Theatre
The Name's the Same
Out of the Fog *
Personal Appearance Theater
Rebound
Say It with Acting
Tales of Tomorrow
Trouble with Father

Not returning from 1950–51:
The Billy Rose Show
Buck Rogers
Can You Top This?
Club Seven
The College Bowl
Dick Tracy
Faith Baldwin Romance Theatre
Feature Film
First Nighter
The Game of the Week
Holiday Hotel
I Cover Times Square
Penthouse Party
Pro Football Highlights
Roller Derby
Sandy Dreams
Showtime U.S.A.
Sit or Miss
Soap Box Theater

CBS

Returning Series
The Alan Young Show
Amos 'n' Andy
Arthur Godfrey's Talent Scouts
Beat the Clock
Big Town
Celebrity Time
Claudia (moved from NBC in midseason)
Crime Photographer
Danger
Douglas and the News
Faye Emerson's Wonderful Town
The Frank Sinatra Show
The Fred Waring Show
The Garry Moore Show
The Gene Autry Show
The George Burns and Gracie Allen Show
Hollywood Opening Night
It's News to Me
The Jack Benny Show
The Ken Murray Show
Live Like a Millionaire
Lux Video Theatre
Mama
Man Against Crime
Our Miss Brooks
Pabst Blue Ribbon Bouts
The Perry Como Show
Racket Squad
The Show Goes On
Songs for Sale
Sports Spot
Star of the Family
The Stork Club
Strike It Rich
Studio One
Suspense
This is Show Business
Toast of the Town
The Web
What's My Line?

New Series
The Al Pearce Show *
CBS Television Workshop *
City Hospital *
Crime Syndicated
The Eddy Arnold Show *
Footlights Theater *
The Garry Moore Evening Show
Hollywood Opening Night
I Love Lucy
MLB
Police Story *
The Sammy Kaye Variety Show
Schlitz Playhouse of Stars
See It Now
Star of the Family
What in the World?

Not returning from 1950–51:
The Ad-Libbers
Big Top
Faye Emerson's Wonderful Town
The Goldbergs
The Horace Heidt Show
Magnavox Theater
Prudential Family Playhouse
Sing It Again
Sure as Fate
Teller of Take
The Vaughn Monroe Show
We Take Your Word
Who's Whose

DuMont

Returning series
The Adventures of Ellery Queen
The Arthur Murray Party
The Bigelow Theatre (moved from ABC
Broadway to Hollywood
Captain Video and His Video Rangers
Cavalcade of Stars
Cosmopolitan Theatre
Down You Go
Football This Week
Front Page Detective
The Gallery of Mme. Liu-Tsong
Georgetown University Forum
Hands of Mystery
Johnny Olson's Rumpus Room
The Johns Hopkins Science Review
Keep Posted
Major Dell Conway of the Flying Tigers
Not for Publication
Pentagon
The Plainclothesman
Rocky King, Inside Detective
Shadow of the Cloak
Stage Entrance
They Stand Accused
Twenty Questions
What's the Story
Wrestling from Columbia Park
Wrestling from Marigold
You Asked For It

New series
Battle of the Ages *
The Cases of Eddie Drake *
Cosmopolitan Theatre
Crawford Mystery Theatre
Football This Week
The Gallery of Mme. Liu-Tsong
Guess What *
Guide Right *
News Gal
The Pet Shop *
Public Prosecutor
The Talent Shop
This is Music

Not returning from 1950–51:
The Al Morgan Show
The Armed Forces Hour
Cavalcade of Bands
Country Style
DuMont Royal Theater
The Hazel Scott Show
Ladies Before Gentlemen
Manhattan Spotlight
The Most Important People
Okay, Mother
Once Upon a Tune
Our Secret Weapon: The Truth
Rhythm Rodeo
Saturday Night at the Garden
The Susan Raye Show
Visit with Armed Forces
With This Ring
Wrestling from Columbia Park Arena

NBC

Returning Series
The Aldrich Family
All-Star Revue
Armstrong Circle Theatre
The Big Story
Blind Date
Break the Bank
Camel News Caravan
Cameo Theatre
Candid Camera
Colgate Comedy Hour
Duffy's Tavern
Fireside Theatre
Ford Festival
The Freddy Martin Show
Gillette Cavalcade of Sports
Goodyear Television Playhouse
Greatest Fights of the Century
The Halls of Ivy
The Kate Smith Evening Hour
Kraft Television Theatre
Leave It to the Girls
Lights Out
The Little Show
Martin Kane, Private Eye
The Mohawk Showroom
The Paul Winchell Show
One Man's Family
The Original Amateur Hour
Philco Television Playhouse
Quiz Kids
Robert Montgomery Presents
Somerset Maugham TV Theatre
Texaco Star Theater
Treasury Men in Action (moved from ABC)
The Voice of Firestone
Watch Mr. Wizard
Wayne King
We, the People
Who Said That?
You Bet Your Life
Your Hit Parade
Your Show of Shows
Your Story Theatre

New Series
American Youth Forum
The Big Payoff *
The Bill Goodwin Show
Bob and Ray *
Boss Lady *
Chesterfield Sound-off Time
Claudia *
The Dinah Shore Show
Dragnet *
Ford Festival *
Gangbusters *
Henry Morgan's Great Talent Hunt
The Kate Smith Evening Hour
Kukla, Fran and Ollie
Public Prosecutor
The Red Skelton Show
The Roy Rogers Show
Summer Stock Theatre *
Young Mr. Bobbin
Your Prize Story *

Not returning from 1950–51:
Bonny Maid Versatile Varieties
Garroway at Large
Greatest Fights of the Century
The Hank McCune Show
Hawkins Falls
Henry Morgan's Great Talent Hunt
The Jack Carter Show
Kay Kyser's Kollege of Musical Knowledge
The Mohawk Showroom
Saturday Roundup
Screen Directors Playhouse
Seven at Eleven
Short Story Playhouse
The Speidel Show
The Straw Hat Matinee
Tag the Gag
Take a Chance
The Wayne King Show

Note: The * indicates that the program was introduced in midseason.

References

 McNeil, Alex. Total Television. Fourth edition. New York: Penguin Books. .
 Brooks, Tim & Marsh, Earle (1964). The Complete Directory to Prime Time Network TV Shows (3rd ed.). New York: Ballantine. .

External links
 
 

United States primetime network television schedules
United States network television schedule
United States network television schedule